The 2019–20 Guam Soccer League (also known as the Budweiser Soccer League for sponsorship reasons) is the 31st season of Guam Soccer League, Guam's first-tier professional soccer league.

The season started on 19 October 2019 and was suspended in March 2020 due to the COVID-19 pandemic.

Teams
A total of nine teams competed in the league with UOG Tritons joining the league. NAPA Rovers were the defending champions. 

BOG Strykers
Islanders
LOA Heat
NAPA Rovers
Quality Distributors
Guam Shipyard
Sidekicks
Manhoben Lalåhi
UOG Tritons

League table

</onlyinclude>

References

Guam Soccer League seasons
2019–20 in Asian association football leagues
Guam Soccer League, 2019-20